Garnett E. Blair (July 31, 1921 – January 12, 1996) was an American baseball pitcher in the Negro leagues. 

A native of East Carnegie, Pennsylvania, Blair served in the US Army during World War II. He played from 1942 to 1952 with the Homestead Grays and the Richmond Giants. He also played for the Richmond Colts of the Piedmont League in 1953. His brother, Lonnie Blair, also played in the Negro leagues.

References

External links
 and Seamheads 
 Garnett Blair at SABR Biography Project

1921 births
1996 deaths
Homestead Grays players
Richmond Giants players
African Americans in World War II
United States Army personnel of World War II
Baseball players from Pennsylvania
African-American United States Army personnel